Baphiopsis parviflora is an African species of flowering plants in the legume family, Fabaceae. It belongs to the subfamily Faboideae. It is the only member of the genus Baphiopsis. It was traditionally assigned to the tribe Swartzieae; however, recent molecular phylogenetic analyses reassigned Baphiopsis parviflora into the Baphieae tribe.

References 

Baphieae
Monotypic Fabaceae genera
Taxa named by John Gilbert Baker
Taxa named by George Bentham